Myung, also spelled Myeong, Myong, or Myoung, is a Korean family name, a single-syllable Korean given name, and an element in some two-syllable Korean given names. Its meaning differs based on the hanja used to write it.

Family name
The surname Myeong is derived from the Chinese surname Ming, written with the hanja , meaning "bright" or "brilliance". The 2000 South Korean census estimated that 26,746 people had this family name. In a study by the National Institute of the Korean Language based on 2007 application data for South Korean passports, it was found that 62.1% of people with this surname spelled it in Latin letters as Myung in their passports. The Revised Romanisation spelling Myeong was in second place at 18.9%, while another 16.2% used the spelling Myoung. Rarer alternative spellings (the remaining 2.8%) included Myeoung.

People with this family name include:
Myoung Bok-hee (born 1979), South Korean team handball player
Myung Jae-nam (1939–1999), South Korean hapkido practitioner
Myung Ji-yun (born 1975), South Korean actress
John Myung (born 1967), American bassist of Korean descent, founder of Dream Theater
John Myung (poker player), American poker player of Korean descent
Myung Kwang-sik (1940–2009), South Korean hapkido practitioner
Myung Rye-hyun (born 1929), North Korean football manager
Myung Se-bin (born 1975), South Korean actress

Given name

Hanja
There are 19 hanja with the reading "myeong" on the South Korean government's official list of hanja which may be registered for use in given names.

 (이름 명 ireum myeong): "name"
 (목숨 명 moksum myeong): "life"
 (밝을 명 balgeul myeong): "bright"
 (울 명 ul myeong): "cry", "chirp"
 (새길 명 saegil myeong): "inscription"
 (바다 명 bada myeong): "sea"
 (저물 명 jeomul myeong): "to darken"
 (홈통 명 homtong myeong): "drainpipe"
 (그릇 명 geureut myeong): "dish"
 (눈 감을 명 nun gameul myeong): "to close one's eyes"
 (차 싹 명 cha ssak myeong): "tea plant"
 (명협 명 myeonghyeop myeong):
 (멸구 명 myeolgu myeong): "leafhopper"
 (술 취할 명 sul chwihal myeong): "drunk"
 (너그러울 명 neogeureoul myeong): "generous"
 (강 이름 명 gang ireum myeong): name of a river
 (밝을 명 balgeul myeong): "bright"
 (초명새 명 chomyeongsae myeong): a legendary bird
 (어두울 명 eoduul myeong): "dark"

People
People with the single-syllable given name Myung include:
Yun Myeong (fl. 15th century), Joseon Dynasty scholar-official

As name element
One name containing this element, Myung-sook, was the fifth-most popular name for newborn girls in South Korea in 1950. Names containing this element include:

Myung-hee (unisex)
Myung-hoon (masculine)
Myung-hwa (feminine)
Myung-hwan (masculine)
Myung-jun (masculine)
Myung-ok (feminine)
Myung-soo (masculine)
Myung-sook (feminine)
Myung-soon (feminine)
Myung-yong (masculine)
Jung-myung (masculine)

See also
List of Korean family names
List of Korean given names

References

Korean-language surnames
Korean given names